The Iroquois Steeplechase (also known as the Iroquois Hurdle Stakes) is an American Grade I NSA sanctioned steeplechase race run each May at Percy Warner Park in Nashville, Tennessee.

The race dates back to 1941 and has been held annually, except in 1945, due to World War II, and in 2020, due to the COVID-19 pandemic. The Iroquois itself is the culmination of a card of races which usually includes five to seven preliminary races, both flat races and steeplechases. The race is named for Iroquois, the first American-bred Thoroughbred to win the prestigious British Epsom Derby. 

Several winners of the race have been named American Champion Steeplechase Horse, including Flatterer, Lonesome Glory, Correggio, All Gong, Good Night Shirt, Pierrot Lunaire, Divine Fortune, Demonstrative, Rawnaq, and Scorpiancer.

Records since 1991
Speed record:
5:36.20 – Arcadius (2012)

Most wins by a horse:
 3 – Uncle Edwin (1982, 1985, 1986)

Most wins by a jockey:
 4 – Blythe Miller (1991, 1992, 1995, 2002)

Most wins by a trainer:
 7 – Jack Fisher (1996, 2007, 2008, 2017, 2019, 2021, 2022)

Most wins by an owner:
 4 – Burton Street US (2017, 2019, 2021, 2022)
 3 – Irvin S. Naylor (2010, 2011, 2016)
 3 – William C. Lickle (1991, 1992, 1997)

Winners

1982–1990
	 	  	 	  	  	 	 
1982	Uncle Edwin
1983	Census 	 
1984	Census
1985	Uncle Edwin
1986	Uncle Edwin
1987	Flatterer
1988	Steve Canyon
1989	Kesslin
1990	Pacific Spy

1991–present

References

Steeplechase (horse racing)
Sports competitions in Nashville, Tennessee
Culture of Nashville, Tennessee
1941 establishments in Tennessee
Recurring sporting events established in 1941